Aureimonas galii is a Gram-negative and rod-shaped bacteria from the genus of Aurantimonas which has been isolated from the phyllosphere of the plant Galium album.

References

External links
Type strain of Aureimonas galii at BacDive -  the Bacterial Diversity Metadatabase

Hyphomicrobiales
Bacteria described in 2016